Benjamin Jamie (born 1978) is a British painter based in London.
He was educated at the University of Gloucestershire and the Ecole Cantonale D'Art Du Valais in Sierre, Switzerland. He completed 2 years on the Turps Banana Painting Programme in London.

He was one of the five Prizewinners for the John Moores Painting Prize 2016.

References

External links
Ben Jamie, own website

1978 births
Alumni of the University of Gloucestershire
Living people
British painters
British male painters
20th-century British male artists